Robert Michael Iler (born March 2, 1985) is an American former actor. He is best known for his portrayal of A.J. Soprano on The Sopranos. His film roles include Tadpole (2002), and Daredevil (2003).

Career
Iler appeared in the video for Marilyn Manson's single "Dope Hat" (1995) at the age of 10.

By mid-1997, he was appearing in commercials for Pizza Hut, and attending three or four auditions a week. He had also appeared on Saturday Night Live and in some film parts, but nothing that brought him great recognition. It was then that he won the role of A.J. Soprano, the son of series lead Tony Soprano, on the HBO drama The Sopranos, which aired from 1999–2007. By May 2001, he had begun home schooling for his education.

After the conclusion of The Sopranos in 2007, Iler largely retired from acting, instead moving to Las Vegas to pursue a career as a professional poker player, where he participated in both official and unsanctioned games. In September 2019, Iler moved to Los Angeles, where he started the podcast Pajama Pants alongside The Sopranos co-star Jamie-Lynn Sigler and YouTube comedian Kassem G.

Personal life 
Iler struggled with substance abuse, particularly after The Sopranos ended. He has been sober since 2013.

In July 2001, Iler was arrested for the robbery of two teenagers in his Upper East Side neighborhood and for possession of marijuana. He pleaded guilty to a single charge of larceny and received three years' probation.

He was present on October 23, 2005, when the underground poker club Ace Point was raided by the police; however, no charges were filed against him.

Filmography

Film

Television

References

External links

Court TV's coverage of Robert Iler robbery case

1985 births
Male actors from New York City
American male child actors
American male film actors
American people of Irish descent
American male television actors
Living people
People from the Upper East Side
21st-century American male actors
American people convicted of theft